The Great White Monkey is an acoustic live album that was available to buy at acoustic performances by The Wildhearts frontman Ginger. The album was recorded at the Rugeley Rose Theatre in Staffordshire England on 27 September 2003. The show itself consisted of two sets (the band deciding to support themselves), however the recording was a single CD that was one condensed set featuring a mixture of tracks from both sets. The album proved incredibly popular, with early copies of the album fetching over £80 on eBay. An expanded 2-CD version containing both sets was released by Round Records on 1 June 2009.

Track listing 
All songs written by Ginger unless noted otherwise.
"Geordie in Wonderland"
"Sky Chaser High"
"Nita Nitro"
"One Love, One Life, One Girl"
"Inside Out"
"Hocus Pocus" (Focus)
"The Daftness"
"Reinventing the Wheel"
"I'm a Lover Not a Fighter"
"There's Only One Hell"
"Ltd" (Jon Poole)
"Dangerlust"
"Cheers" (Judy Hart Angelo/Gary Portnoy)
"Does Your Mother Know" (ABBA)
"Sky Babies / Space Oddity" (Ginger / David Bowie)
"I Wanna Go Where the People Go"

Credits 
 Ginger - vocals, guitar
 Jon Poole - vocals, guitar
 Hot Steve - guitars
 Recorded, Mixed and Mastered by Jase Edwards

References 

Ginger (musician) albums
2004 live albums